Olympique de Marseille won Division 1 season 1988/1989 of the French Association Football League with 73 points.

Participating teams

 Auxerre
 Bordeaux
 SM Caen
 AS Cannes
 Stade Lavallois
 RC Lens
 Lille
 Olympique Marseille
 FC Metz
 AS Monaco
 Montpellier La Paillade SC
 FC Nantes Atlantique
 OGC Nice
 Matra Racing
 Paris Saint-Germain FC
 AS Saint-Etienne
 FC Sochaux-Montbéliard
 RC Strasbourg
 Sporting Toulon Var
 Toulouse FC

League table

Promoted from Division 2, who will play in Division 1 season 1989/1990
 Olympique Lyonnais: Champion of Division 2, winner of Division 2 group B
 FC Mulhouse: Runner-up, winner of Division 2 group A
 Stade Brest: Third place, winner of barrages against RC Strasbourg

Results

Relegation play-offs

|}

Top goalscorers

References

 Division 1 season 1988-1989 at pari-et-gagne.com

Ligue 1 seasons
France
1